The inaugural Mundialito de Clubes (or Club World Cup) is a beach soccer tournament that will take place at the Praia do Sol stadium at Represa de Guarapiranga, a reservoir located in São Paulo, Brazil from 19 – 26 March 2011. The stadium will have a seating capacity of 3,500 spectators.

Participating teams
It was determined that ten teams, divided into two groups of five, will take part in the tournament:

It was originally speculated that the newly reformed New York Cosmos of the United States would take part in the tournament and had been later replaced by Shakhtar Donetsk of the Ukraine. It was also speculated that Marseille of France would take part as well, but the final spot was disputed between them and Milan. It was also announced at the draw that an as-yet-undetermined fourth Brazilian team will round out the club roster at 10, which was later revealed as Santos.

Draft procedure

On 21 February 2011, at two simultaneous cities (Barcelona, Spain and São Paulo, Brazil), the Official Draft took place, with each team selecting nine players each.

According to the draft procedure, the team representative of every Club is to attend that meeting in one of the two aforementioned venues, and he will be the responsible of picking the players for his squad. All Beach Soccer players can be potentially selected, and, just as it happens in great events for leagues such as the NBA, NHL or Major League Baseball, in order to set a balanced, competitive tournament, the Draft for the players’ election will follow some guidelines.

Players

The 'Draft' followed the following criteria: three national players (chosen beforehand), three continental players (up two from the same country), a player UEFA / CONMEBOL (South America and Europe), a player from AFC / CAF / CONCACAF / OFC (Asia / Africa / North America and the Caribbean / Oceania) player and a 'national'.

Squads

Group stage
The draw to divide the ten teams into the following two groups was conducted on 3 March 2011. The group stage commenced on 19 March 2011 and consisted of each team playing each other once in a single round-robin format.

All kickoff times are listed as local time in São Paulo, (UTC-3).

Group A

Group B

Knockout stage
A draw was held after the group stage matches were completed to determine the quarterfinal pairings.

Quarter finals

Semi finals

Third place playoff

Final

Winners

Awards

Final placement

Goal scorers

 16 goals
  André ( Flamengo)
 10 goals
  Fernando DDI ( Sporting CP)
 9 goals
  Dmitry Shishin ( Barcelona)
  Egor Shaykov ( Lokomotiv Moscow)
 8 goals
  Anderson ( Flamengo)
 7 goals
  Juninho Alagoano ( Corinthians)
  Bruno Xavier ( Vasco da Gama)
  Pampero ( Vasco da Gama)
 6 goals
  Daniel Lima ( Lokomotiv Moscow)
  Maci ( Lokomotiv Moscow)
 5 goals
  Buru ( Corinthians)
  Igor Borsuk ( Lokomotiv Moscow)
  Alan ( Sporting CP)
  Rafinha ( Vasco da Gama)
  Belchior ( Sporting CP)
  Betinho ( Vasco da Gama)
 4 goals
  Dunga ( Santos)
  Kuman ( Santos)
  Bruno Malías ( Boca Juniors)
  Stephan Meier ( Milan)
  Jose Mena ( Santos)
  Luciano Franceschini ( Boca Juniors)
  Frank ( Seattle Sounders)
  Ilya Leonov ( Lokomotiv Moscow)
 3 goals
  Minici ( Corinthians)
  Francisco Cati ( Seattle Sounders)
  Juanma ( Barcelona)
  Yuri Morales ( Seattle Sounders)
  Dejan Stankovic ( Milan)
  Javi Torres ( Barcelona)
  Fabian ( Corinthians)

 2 goals
  Victor Lopez ( Boca Juniors)
  Stephane François ( Milan)
  Madjer ( Sporting CP)
  Yahya Al-Araimi ( Corinthians)
  Carlos Longa ( Flamengo)
  Osmar Moreira ( Seattle Sounders)
  Ahmed ( Milan)
  Claudinho ( Milan)
  Gabriel ( Vasco da Gama)
  Yuri Gorchinskiy ( Lokomotiv Moscow)
  Ali Karim ( Seattle Sounders)
  Boguslaw Saganowski ( Sporting CP)
  Ricardo Villalobos ( Vasco da Gama)
  Souza ( Flamengo)
 1 goal
  Du Alves ( Santos)
  Nicolas Bella ( Boca Juniors)
  Benjamin ( Corinthians)
  Bernardo Botelho ( Vasco da Gama)
  Duda ( Flamengo)
  Anderson Tavares ( Flamengo)
  Fabricio ( Santos)
  Fred ( Barcelona)
  Jorginho ( Vasco da Gama)
  Michele Leghissa ( Sporting CP)
  Rui Mota ( Barcelona)
  Dannilo Neumann ( Corinthians)
  Nico ( Barcelona)
  Ricardinho ( Santos)
  Juninho Erivaldo Santos ( Milan)
  Bruno Xavier ( Sporting CP)
Own goal
  Gabriel (for Barcelona )

See also
Beach soccer
Beach Soccer Worldwide

References

External links
Beach Soccer Worldwide
Beach Soccer Brasil (Portuguese)
Mundialito de Clubes Beach Soccer (Portuguese)

Mundialito de Clubes
Mundialito De Clubes
2011
Sport in São Paulo
2011 in beach soccer